Box Ridge, New South Wales  is  a bounded rural locality in New South Wales. The suburb is adjacent to the town of Binnaway and lies on the Binnaway to Werris Creek Railway. The locality is southeast of Coonabarabran.

References

Localities in New South Wales